Estadio Nacional Soberanía is located in Managua, Nicaragua. It has a capacity of 15,000 and it was named after former MLB player Dennis Martínez.

The original stadium was built in 1948 and is Nicaragua's national stadium. It is used mainly for baseball but also serves as a venue for concerts, boxing, football, religious events and had a capacity of 30,100 people. It is the home stadium of Indios del Bóer baseball team and Deportivo Walter Ferretti football team. Inside the stadium is a hall of fame near the entrance showing medals, cups, photos and memories of Nicaraguan players. There is also a gym located inside.

Renaming
The stadium has been renamed three times. Built in 1948, it was originally named "El Estadio Nacional" (The National Stadium).  After the 1972 earthquake that struck Managua and destroyed 90% of the city, it was rebuilt and renamed after Anastasio Somoza García. In 1979, after the Sandinistas overthrew the Somoza dynasty, it was renamed in honor of Rigoberto López Pérez, the man who, in 1956, assassinated Anastasio Somoza García.  On November 20, 1998, the 50th anniversary of the founding of the stadium, then-President Arnoldo Alemán issued a decree changing the stadium's name to Estadio Nacional Dennis Martínez.  Dennis Martínez, born in 1955 (several years after this stadium had opened), was Major League Baseball's first Nicaraguan-born player.

New Dennis Martinez National Stadium
The new Dennis Martinez National Stadium was sponsored by the Taiwan government and began construction in 2016. It was completed in October 2017. The first sport event in the stadium was the Baseball series of three games between Nicaragua & Chinese Taipei (Taiwan) in October 20–22, 2017. It played host to the Central American Games in 2017. The stadium, located near the Tiscapa lagoon, is approximately 3 kilometers southeast of the original stadium. It was designed by Dynamica and it has a capacity of 15,000. The field meets Major League Baseball specifications and could potentially host a Major League Baseball game.

See also
Nicaragua
Culture of Nicaragua

References

External links
Instituto Nicaragüense de Juventud y Deporte
World Stadiums page
Fussballtempel.net - Photo gallery

1948 establishments in Nicaragua
Athletics (track and field) venues in Nicaragua
Baseball venues in Nicaragua
Football venues in Managua
Nicaragua
Sports venues completed in 1948
Buildings and structures in Managua
Tourist attractions in Managua